Wincentów  is a village in the administrative district of Gmina Lubartów, within Lubartów County, Lublin Voivodeship, in eastern Poland. It consists of a scattering of farmsteads across flat arable land to the west of highway 19.

References

Villages in Lubartów County